Golf was contested at the 2017 Summer Universiade from 24 to 26 August at the Sunrise Golf and Country Club in Taoyuan, Taiwan. All the final round on 27 August was cancelled due to the thunderstorm, all the results are calculated to round 3 only.

Participating nations

Medal summary

Medal table

References

External links
2017 Summer Universiade – Golf
Result book – Golf

 
Golf at the Summer Universiade
2017 Summer Universiade events
Universiade
Sport in Taoyuan City